The Horse Hospital is a Grade II listed not for profit, independent arts venue at Colonnade, Bloomsbury, central London. It has a curatorial focus on counter-cultural histories, sub-cultures and outsider as well as emerging artists. It delivers through frequent events, underground film and artist's moving image screenings, and exhibitions. Founded in 1992 by Roger K. Burton, the venue opened with Vive Le Punk!, a retrospective of Vivienne Westwood's punk designs in 1993.

The building was originally built by James Burton in 1797 as stabling for cab drivers' sick horses.

History
Initially programmed by Burton and Ian White, the venue's reputation grew both in London and abroad. James B. L. Hollands later replaced White as curator. The artist, Tai Shani was the programmer from 2006 to 2016, followed by Sholto Dobie and Letitia Calin.

In 1998, the Horse Hospital hosted the debut British exhibition by outsider artist / painter Joe Coleman which attracted a new audience. Subsequently, the venue played host to a variety of performers, musicians, artists, film makers and writers, including Dame Darcy, Anita Pallenberg, Iain Aitch, Jack Sargeant, Valie Export, Chris Carter, David Tibet, Helen Chadwick, Dennis Cooper, Nan Goldin, Morton Bartlett, Lydia Lunch, Bruce Bickford, Gee Vaucher and Crass, Alejandro Jodorowsky, Stewart Home, Jeremy Reed, Franko B, Ron Athey, Banksy, Marc Almond, Yvonne Rainer, Artūras Barysas and others.

It has also been used by various record labels, publishing houses including Soft Skull Press, Verso, Serpent's Tail and Clear Cut Press. and journals such as Strange Attractor and Granta for special events, as well as a screening space for numerous film festivals including the Fashion in Film Festival, London International Animation Festival, London Porn Film Festival amongst others.

The Horse Hospital houses and is supported by the Contemporary Wardrobe Collection, a fashion archive that specialises in post-war street fashion, sub-cultures and British design. The Chamber of Pop Culture is located there. Proud Camden has been located there since about 2008.

In 2015 The Horse Hospital was listed with London Borough of Camden as a Community Asset and the site was selected for inclusion in the British Library’s UK Web Archive as a website of cultural importance.

In 2019 it was announced that The Horse Hospital was at risk of closure after its landlord proposed a 333 per cent rent increase, from £30,000 to £130,000 annually from the beginning of 2020. At the start of January 2020 it secured an extension on its lease until 28 February. Eventually, according to The Horse Hospital's website, a new lease was secured until December 2024, with a rent increase of 33%.

The building
The building is Grade II listed. It was originally built by James Burton in 1797 as stabling for cab drivers' sick horses, the Horse Hospital is notable for its unique stone tiled floor. Access to both floors is by concrete moulded ramps, the upper floor ramp retains hardwood slats preventing the horses from slipping. It can be found at Colonnade, Bloomsbury, London.

Major exhibitions

1993 Vive Le Punk!, Vivienne Westwood and Malcolm McLaren
1998 Original Sin, Joe Coleman
1998 Remote Control, Laurie Lipton
1998 Meet, Brian Griffin
1999 Car, Photographs by Peter Anderson
1999 Andre the Giant Has a Posse by Shepard Fairey
2000 Oh Lover Boy, Franko B
2000 The Situation At This Address Has Changed, Sculpture, Drawing, Painting Harry Forbes
2000 Transromantik, Cathy Ward and Eric Wright
2001 Two Es And A Viagra, Peter Rigby
2001 Beat 13!, Lucy McLauchlan, Tim Watkins, Al Murphy
2001 Gee Vaucher
2001 Hospital Brut, The Toxic art of Le Dernier Cri
2002 David Tibet and Steven Stapleton
2003 The Bogside Artists
2003 Unquiet Voices, English and American Visionary Art 1903 – 2003
2004 Heralding the Apocalypse, Barry Hale
2005 The 45th Annual Convention of the Middleman and the Cherry Brigade – Tai Shani
2006 Some Bizzare Exhibition, Stevo Pearce
2007 Visual Athletics Club, Edward Barber
2007 The Other Side of the Island David J Smith
2008 Miron Zownir – Radical Eye
2008 Sandow Birk – Dante's Inferno
2008 Sacred Pastures – Cathy Ward, Eric Wright and Norbert Kox
2008 Instead of wives, they shall have toads, Stephen Fowler
2008 30,000 Years of Cryptomnesia
2008 From Fear to Sanity – CND and the Art of Protest from 1958 to 1963
2009 The Impossible World of Stu Mead
2010 HOLOGRAPHY for Beginners, Ole Hagen
2010 Drag and Cinema, Cinema in Drag – Brice Dellsperger
2010 Ian Johnstone – The 23 Stab Wounds Of Julius Caesar
2010 Fake Food & Fast Cars: The Pop Couture of Kate Forbes
2011 Adrian Di Duca: Monstrorum Historia
2011 Edweard Muybridge: Muybridge's Revolver
2011 Ronny Long – My Life on Earth 1991–2002
2011 Every beautiful thing... The Michael Ho Chong Collection
2012 The Playgrounds of War – Gina Glover
2012 LFP: The Queen, The Chairman And I – Kurt Tong
2012 The Butcher Of Common Sense
2012 Bunti's Picture Show – Ian Ward
2012 Camouflage, Revolution, and Desire – drawing from movies
2013 Morton Bartlett
2013 Jacques Katmor & The 3rd Eye Group
2013 BASHA: the unsung hero of Polish poster art
2013 The Hobo Kings and Queens of Leanne Castillo
2014 A Goodly Company: Ethel Le Rossignol
2014 Walerian Borowczyk – Posters and Lithography
2014 The Opium Den: Jennifer Binnie
2014 Nick Abrahams – Lions & Tigers & Bears
2014 Alien Puma Space Train: The Visionary Work Of Daniel S. Christiansen
2014 Saturation 70
2014 Stephen Holman
2014 Stephen Dwoskin – Ha! Ha!
2015 The School Of The Damned Degree Show 2015
2015 Melinda Gebbie: What Is The Female Gaze?
2015 George Tobias: My Little Kingdom
2015: X-Ray Audio by Stephen Coates
2016 The Detroit Artists Workshop
2016 Punk in Translation: Burst City
2016 Plastique Fantastique: After London
2016 Welcome, Space Brothers: The Unarius Academy Of Science
2016 Destroy All Monsters
2016 Autopsia: Thanatopolis
2017 The Higher Powers Bible: From Genesis To Revelation, Lee ‘Scratch’ Perry and Peter Harris
2017 Cesca Dvorak: Dewy Guises
2017 Peace Love And Anarchy = Freedom And Fun Forever: exhibition of the squatted house, 64–65 Guildford Street 
2018 Jakup Ferri: Muscle memory 
2018 The Art of Magic
2018 Relating Narratives: A Common World of Women
2018 Cathy Ward: Sub Rosa
2018 Trigger Warning: Films of Tessa Hughes-Freeland
2019 Herve Guibert: Modesty or Immodesty
2019 Lunar Futurism: Costumes, Props & Ephemera from Andrzej Żuławski's 'On the Silver Globe'
2019 Lydia Lunch Presents: SO REAL IT HURTS 
2019 Jenkin van Zyl: Oblivion Industry
2019 The Gutter Art of Stephen Varble: Genderqueer Performance Art in the 1970s, photographs by Greg Day
2019 Psychic Communities –_ Drift Fright: New Noveta residency

References

External links

"The real home of avant-garde" by Iain Aitch in the Evening Standard

Performing arts in London
Contemporary art galleries in London
Cinemas in London
Event venues established in 1992
Arts centres in London
Art galleries established in 1992
1992 establishments in England
Grade II listed buildings in the London Borough of Camden